Martin Hürlimann (12 November 1897 in Zürich – 4 March 1984 in Zürich) was a Swiss publisher, better known in the English-speaking world as a photographer. 

Following successful completion, at Frauenfeld, of his school career, Hürlimann went on to study History, German literature and Philosophy at Zürich, Leipzig and Berlin universities. His doctoral thesis, submitted and accepted in 1924, was entitled Die Aufklärung in Zürich. Die Entwicklung des Zürcher Protestantismus im 18. Jahrhundert.

In 1929, Hürlimann founded the newspaper "Atlantis", based in Berlin and specialising in international travel and related themes. In 1930, he founded "Atlantis Verlag", a publishing house, taking over from Ernest Wasmuth publication of the "Orbis Terrarum" series of books. In 1933, he married Bettina Kiepenheuer, the oldest daughter of Gustav Kiepenheuer, another publisher. In 1936, he founded a Zürich branch of "Atlantis Verlag", and by 1939, with the outbreak of war, had relocated his head office to Zürich, while retaining a German branch across the border at Freiburg im Breisgau.

His wife and co-publisher, Bettina Hurlimann, is the author of Three Centuries of Children's Books in Europe, published 1967. They lived in Uerikon, Switzerland.

His photographic work was published in a number of books. Western European cities were a common theme, but he also photographed Ceylon and Southeast Asia.

In the 1930 English edition of his book Burma, Ceylon, Indo-China, Hürlimann wrote "My photographs were chiefly taken with a Sinclair Una camera, Zeiss lens, and Kodak films."

Books
 Burma, Ceylon, Indo-China - Siam, Cambodia, Annam, Tongking, Yunnan, B. Westermann Co. Inc., New York, 1930
 
 Bilder aus Berlin, Potsdam und Umgebung, Atlantis Verlag Berlin, 1936
 Delhi, Agra, Fatehpur Sikri, Thames & Hudson, London, 1965.
 Gothic cathedrals: Paris, Chartres, Amiens, Reims, B.H. Blackwell, Ltd, 1938 (reprinted from the German, Atlantis-Verlag A.-G. Zürich, 1937)
 Englische Kathedralen, Atlantis Verlag AG, Zurich, 1948, translation Thames and Hudson, London
 Eternal France, Thames & Hudson. 1952 — 216 b/w photographs in photogravure
 Italy, Thames & Hudson. 1953 — 225 b/w photographs in photogravure
 London, Thames & Hudson 1956 — 115 b/w photographs in photogravure, six colour plates, introduced by Eric Walter White
 Europe, Thames & Hudson 1957
 Traveller in the Orient, Atlantis Verlag AG, Zurich, 1959, translation Thames and Hudson, London, 1960

Notes

Swiss photographers
20th-century publishers (people)
1897 births
1984 deaths